Donald Tytler (8 March 1924 in Toronto – 15 November 2005) was a Canadian sailor who competed in the 1952 Summer Olympics and in the 1956 Summer Olympics.

References

1924 births
2005 deaths
Sportspeople from Toronto
Canadian male sailors (sport)
Olympic sailors of Canada
Sailors at the 1952 Summer Olympics – 6 Metre
Sailors at the 1956 Summer Olympics – Dragon